The Eastman Raiders Football Club are a Canadian Youth Football Club located in Steinbach, Manitoba. The team participates in leagues organized by the Manitoba Minor Football Association of which the club is a member. The Eastman Raiders Football Club was formed in 1991 by Paul Beauchamp, operates at four different ages levels, and play home games at A.D. Penner Park, with facilities including bleachers, canteens, team clubhouses and an electronic scoreboard. The most notable Raiders alumni is Canadian Football League star Andrew Harris.

References

External links
 www.eastmanraiders.com
 www.midgetfootball.ca
 www.footballmanitoba.com

Sports clubs established in 1991
Canadian football teams in Manitoba
Sport in Steinbach, Manitoba
1991 establishments in Manitoba
Raiders